National Register of Historic Places listings in the city of Baltimore, Maryland

This list covers some of the properties in the independent city of Baltimore, but not those in the county of Baltimore surrounding the city.  The county does not include the city, which is an independent county-equivalent.

Current listings

|}

See also
National Register of Historic Places listings in Maryland

References

History of Baltimore
East